Ola Antonson Holsen (1808–1864) was a Norwegian politician.

Originally a farmer and school teacher in Holsen, he was elected as a member of Førde municipality council from 1839 to 1859. He was also elected to the Norwegian Parliament in 1845, 1848, 1851 and 1854.

References 
Ola Antonson Holsen at NRK Sogn og Fjordane County Encyclopedia 

1808 births
1864 deaths
Members of the Storting
Sogn og Fjordane politicians